The 1580  was one of many battles fought between the Hōjō and Takeda clans during Japan's Sengoku period. It is distinguished, however, as one of the very few naval battles to be fought in pre-modern Japan.

The battle took place off the coast of the Izu peninsula between the navies of Hōjō Ujimasa, the head of the Hōjō, and those of Takeda Katsuyori, the head of the Takeda. 

The Fūma ninja led by Fūma Kotarō covertly infiltrated and attacked a camp of the Takeda clan forces at night, succeeding in causing severe chaos in the camp, which resulted in massive casualties among the disoriented enemies as they attacked each other.

Later, while the navies faced off, the land armies of each family advanced towards one another. 
In the end, the Hōjō were victorious.

References

1580 in Japan
Omosu 1580
Omosu
Omosu 1580
Omosu